Sara Tommasi (born 9 June 1981) is an Italian actress, television personality, and former pornographic actress. She made her film debut in the 2008 comedy Ultimi della classe, playing a teacher who had appeared in a "sexy" calendar shoot. Tommasi herself had appeared topless in a Max Calendar shoot in 2007. In 2010, she appeared nude in an episode of the television series Crimini.

Personal life
She graduated in economics at Bocconi University in Milan. Currently she lives in Egypt.

Adult film
Tommasi's first hardcore film, Sara Tommasi: Il Mio Primo Film Hard, featuring her in explicit, non-simulated sex scenes, was released in 2012.

References

External links

2007 Sara Tommasi Calendario Max Calendar gallery
Sara Tommasi Playboy Interview, March 2010 (Italian)

Sara Tommasi xFapzap (USA)

1981 births
Living people
People from Narni
Italian female adult models
Italian pornographic film actresses
Italian female models
Italian actresses
Italian showgirls
Italian television personalities
Association footballers' wives and girlfriends
Bocconi University alumni